Patsy McGlone (born 8 July 1959) is an Irish politician from Ballinderry in Northern Ireland. He is a Social Democratic and Labour Party (SDLP) Member of the Northern Ireland Assembly for Mid Ulster, and former Deputy Leader of the SDLP (2010–2011).  He has been an MLA since 2003. On 12 May 2016, McGlone was elected Deputy Speaker of the Northern Ireland Assembly.

From 1993 to 2009, McGlone was also Councillor in Cookstown District Council. He was chairman of the council in 2002–2003 and 2005–2006.
In 1996 he was elected to the Northern Ireland Forum from Mid-Ulster.

While canvassing for McGlone for the 2011 local and assembly elections, election workers had their car attacked with a petrol bomb by loyalists in Coagh.

Membership of organisations
 Board Member of Foras na Gaeilge
 A member of the EU Structural Funds Monitoring Committee for Northern Ireland
 Board Member of the Northern Ireland Housing Executive
 Member of the Northern Ireland Housing Council
 Member of the Irish Central Border Area Network (ICBAN)
 Vice Chairman of Loughshore Foot and Mouth Support Group.

He was a candidate for the leadership of the SDLP in 2011, after announcing in July that he would stand against party leader Margaret Ritchie.

References

External links
Official website

1959 births
Living people
Members of Cookstown District Council
Members of the Northern Ireland Forum
Social Democratic and Labour Party MLAs
People from County Londonderry
Northern Ireland MLAs 2003–2007
Northern Ireland MLAs 2007–2011
Northern Ireland MLAs 2011–2016
Northern Ireland MLAs 2016–2017
Northern Ireland MLAs 2017–2022
Northern Ireland MLAs 2022–2027